Clinton J. Olivier is an American politician who served as the City Council representative for the City of Fresno's Seventh council district. Olivier was elected to the City Council in June 2010 with 62% of the vote. Olivier was sworn into office on December 2, 2010. In 2016 he unsuccessfully ran for the California State Assembly in the 31st district, losing to Democrat Joaquin Arambula. In 2018, he was not eligible to run for reelection due to term limits.

He currently works for The Fresno Bee as a political contributor.

Early life and education 
Olivier was born in Los Alamitos, CA.

He attended Orange Coast College in Costa Mesa, California and majored in Speech Communications at California State University, Long Beach. He served as an air support radioman in the Marine Corps Reserve.

External links
 City of Fresno District 7 Webpage
 Last Dance of the Vestris; Amazon.com
 Last Dance of the Vestris Website

References

California city council members
1975 births
People from Fresno, California
Living people
California State University, Long Beach alumni